The plantar digital veins arise from plexuses on the plantar surfaces of the digits, and, after sending intercapitular veins to join the dorsal digital veins, unite to form four metatarsal veins.

References 

Veins of the lower limb